Kanjikuzhi is a census town in Kottayam district in the Indian state of Kerala.
It is a suburb of Kottayam City. It lies on the Kottayam - Kumily state highway (K.K road).

Demographics
According to the 2011 India census, Kanjikuzhi had a population of 14,076. Males constituted 49% of the population and females 51%. Kanjikuzhi had an average literacy rate of 86%, higher than the national average of 59.5%: male literacy was 88% and female literacy was 84%. 10% of the population were under 6 years of age.

References

Villages in Kottayam districtk